Misilmeri is a town and comune in the Metropolitan City of Palermo, Sicily. The village rose around a castle (today known as Castello dell'Emiro, or "Castle of the Emir") founded by emir Jafar II (998–1019). In 1068 the Battle of Misilmeri was fought between the Normans and Arabs

Misilmeri is located in the Eleuterio Valley on the southern slopes of Montagna Grande.
It is the birthplace of the magistrate Rocco Chinnici.

References

External links

Official website

Municipalities of the Metropolitan City of Palermo